Jabez Gibson (1794–1838) was a prominent businessman based in Saffron Walden, Essex.

Early life
Jabez was born in 1794, the son of Atkinson Francis Gibson and Elizabeth Wyatt.

References

1794 births
1838 deaths